The 2008 Arkansas State Red Wolves football team represented Arkansas State University as a member of the Sun Belt Conference during the 2008 NCAA Division I FBS football season. Led by seventh-year head coach Steve Roberts, the Red Wolves compiled an overall record of 6–6 with a mark of 3–4 in conference play, tying for third place in the Sun Belt. Arkansas State played home games at ASU Stadium in Jonesboro, Arkansas

Schedule

Game summaries

Texas A&M

Arkansas State opened the 2008 season against Texas A&M at Kyle Field. The game was the third meeting between the two programs and second under head coach Steve Roberts. Their previous meeting was in 2003.

Texas Southern

Arkansas State became the first major college team to break the 80-point mark since Texas Tech scored 80 against Sam Houston State in 2005.  The team posted the second-highest score in school history, topped only by a 101-point effort against the University of Central Arkansas in 1917.

Southern Miss

Middle Tennessee

Arkansas State played their homecoming game on September 20 against Middle Tennessee.

Memphis

Louisiana-Monroe

Louisiana-Lafayette

Alabama

FIU

Florida Atlantic

North Texas

Troy

References

Arkansas State
Arkansas State Red Wolves football seasons
Arkansas State Red Wolves football